An earthquake occurred off the coast of the Alaska Peninsula on July 28, 2021, at 10:15 p.m. local time. The large megathrust earthquake had a moment magnitude of 8.2 according to the United States Geological Survey (USGS). A tsunami warning was issued by the National Oceanic and Atmospheric Administration (NOAA) but later cancelled. The mainshock was followed by a number of aftershocks, including three that were of magnitude 5.9, 6.1 and 6.9 respectively.

This was the largest earthquake in the United States since the 1965 Rat Islands earthquake, and the 7th largest earthquake in US history. It was also the strongest earthquake globally since the 2015 Illapel earthquake, tying the 2017 Chiapas earthquake and 2018 Fiji earthquake.

No casualties or serious damage were reported in the aftermath of the mainshock, as well as some of the strong aftershocks. In Perryville, the closest populated area to the quake, cracks appeared in drywalls and on the ground. Some homes were also shifted. The limited impact from this earthquake was attributed to it occurring offshore from the sparsely-populated Alaska Peninsula. A tsunami warning was rescinded and no large waves were observed because the earthquake took place 32 km beneath the seafloor; deep enough that vertical uplift of the seafloor was limited therefore displacing smaller amounts of water.

Tectonic setting
Off the coast of Alaska lies the Aleutian subduction zone–a 2,500 mile long convergent plate boundary where the Pacific Plate subducts under the North American Plate at a rate of 6–7 cm/yr. This megathrust fault has been the source of many large earthquakes including the 1964 Alaskan earthquake that registered a magnitude 9.2 and remains the second largest earthquake in recorded history.

Background
South of the Alaska Peninsula is a segment of the Aleutian subduction zone known as the Shumagin segment, named after the nearby Shumagin Islands. This segment lies between the Unimak and Semidi segments which had ruptured in earthquakes in 1946 and 1938 respectively. In 1971, the Shumagin segment drew the attention of seismologists as it was proposed as a seismic gap because no major seismic activity have occurred in recent times. The most recent events is thought to have occurred in 1788, which were a pair of large events, and in 1854. Two smaller earthquakes shook near the seismic gap in 1917 and 1948. That proposal also highlighted the potential for a tsunami accompanying an earthquake on the gap.

1938 earthquake
The 1938 Semidi earthquake occurred on November 10 at 20:18 UTC. It had an estimated magnitude of 8.2 on the moment magnitude scale, and had an epicenter 40 km west of the epicenter of the 2021 earthquake. It was felt with a maximum Modified Mercalli intensity of VI (Strong), causing limited damage in the relatively unpopulated region of the Alaska Peninsula. While the earthquake generated an ocean-wide tsunami, the maximum wave height was only measured at 0.3 meters. An unusually weak tsunami was generated because the earthquake occurred at a deep depth of 35 km.

The 1938 earthquake ruptured east of the Shumagin segment for a length of approximately 300 km. Rupture of this earthquake did not reach into the Shumagin segment.

Foreshocks
In July 2020, the Aleutian Subduction Zone was the source of an  7.8 earthquake which struck the same region south of the Alaska Peninsula. It was followed by another aftershock of  7.6 in October the same year. The United States Geological Survey have since considered the two earthquakes as foreshocks to the  8.2 in 2021.

July 2020

The earthquake on July 22, 2020, was the result of thrust faulting on the Aleutian subduction zone where the Pacific plate subducts underneath the North American plate, forming the Aleutian Trench and Arc. This convergent boundary is one of the most active in the world, and was the location of the  1964 Alaska earthquake; the largest recorded in North America, and the second largest in the world. On average, the rate at which these plates converge is about 64 mm/year. The earthquake struck east of the Shumagin Gap, a 125 mile-wide (200 km) seismic gap in the subduction zone which hasn't ruptured with a large quake for at least 100 years. Previously, it was thought that the subducting plate in the Shumagin Gap was poorly coupled to the overriding crust, quietly slipping and preventing large quakes. However, research suggests that the seismic gap, contrary to speculation that it might be a relatively "safe" seismic zone in the arc, may pose a threat similar to that of the rest of the Aleutian subduction zone. It was also the largest earthquake in 2020 by magnitude.

The earthquake appears to have only partially ruptured the Shumagin segment of the subduction zone, at 75%. Estimated fault rupture dimensions are a width of 140 km, and length of 250 km, with a depth ranging from 11 to 49 km along the subduction zone. The rupture of this earthquake did not propagate towards the shallow, near trench section of the subduction zone. The lack of seismic activity on the shallow section may suggest that section is locked and accumulating elastic energy, raising the issue on the potential for tsunami earthquakes occurring.

No severe damage or injuries were reported in the aftermath of the earthquake. Mild damage occurred in Sand Point with reports of damaged docks, cracked roads and cement.

October 2020

This earthquake occurred along a north northwest striking strike-slip fault rather than the thrust mechanism seen in the July event. It did not occur along the megathrust boundary but within one of the two interacting plates. Maximum slip along the fault is estimated at 3.4 meters.

A tsunami warning was issued but was later downgraded to an advisory. A wave was measured at 2.3 ft. (70.1 cm) at Sand Point. At King Cove, the tsunami had a wave height of 2.1 ft. (64.0 cm) and was 2.5 ft. at Chignik Bay. In the state of Hawaii, alert level Advisory was issued at 5:55 pm. Wave heights ranging between 0.1-1.2 ft (2–38 cm) were detected along the islands. Tsunami warning was later cancelled at 05:05:15 (UTC).

The earthquake was described as "weird" and "the wrong type" by researchers at Pennsylvania State University. Adding that the earthquake with its strike-slip mechanism "made no sense" because of the location near a subduction zone. The fault involved with the event is situated within the downgoing Pacific slab. It is likely a remnant of a fault structure formed at a distant mid-oceanic spreading ridge. This steeply-dipping, trench perpendicular fault ruptured up the Pacific slab towards the trench for a length of 70 km and caused slip of up to 5 meters.

Observed by scientists was the larger tsunami triggered by the October quake. A possible cause of the larger tsunami was the occurrence of slip on the megathrust boundary as well. Further analysis found that both the strike-slip fault and megathrust rupture had a combined magnitude of  8.0 but seismic signals from the megathrust rupture was undetected. The October 2020 megathrust rupture occurred at a depth shallower than that of the July 2020 event, but failed to rupture towards the seafloor.

Earthquake 
Occurring southeast of Perryville, Alaska (south of the Alaska Peninsula), the earthquake happened as the result of thrust faulting on or near the subduction zone interface between the Pacific and North America plates. The preliminary focal mechanism solution indicates rupture occurred on a fault dipping either shallowly to the northwest, or steeply to the southeast. The location, mechanism and depth – and the large size of the event – are all consistent with slip occurring on the subduction zone interface between the two plates. At the location of this event, the Pacific plate converges with North America to the northwest at a rate of about 64 mm/yr, subducting at the Alaska-Aleutians trench ~125 km to the southeast of the earthquake.

The earthquake was initially reported as having a preliminary magnitude of 7.3 before being upgraded to 8.2.

The focal depth of the magnitude 8.2 mainshock at 32.2 km suggest it was deeper than that of the foreshocks. It is thought to have ruptured the same subduction zone segment that was also involved in a similar-sized event in 1938.

It was the second of three earthquakes of magnitude 8 or higher in 2021. On March 4, 2021, nearly 5 months before the Alaska mainshock, an 8.1 magnitude earthquake struck the Kermadec Islands, a sparsely populated territory owned by New Zealand, and another equally sized event struck the Sub-Antarctic British territory of the South Sandwich Islands on August 12 of that year. This is unusual since earthquakes of magnitude 8 or higher occur only about once every year on average. There is no evidence of a causal relationship between the three events. 2021 has had the most 8.0+ earthquakes in a single year since 2007.

Tsunami

A tsunami warning was issued by the NOAA about 5 minutes after the earthquake. 1 hour and 45 minutes after, the warning was downgraded to an advisory and later canceled 3 hours after the earthquake. In Port San Luis (Avila Beach) on the Central Coast of California, a  tsunami surge was measured by the National Weather Service in a tweet. Near the epicentre, a 8.6-foot (2.62 m) was observed.

See also

List of earthquakes in 2021
List of earthquakes in Alaska
List of earthquakes in the United States
List of megathrust earthquakes

References

Further reading

External links
Alaska's Chignik earthquake shows segmented subduction zone – Temblor, Inc.
 

Earthquakes in Alaska
2021 earthquakes
2021 in Alaska
July 2021 events in the United States
Megathrust earthquakes in Alaska
Chignik
Tsunamis in the United States
Lake and Peninsula Borough, Alaska